The Bank of China Building is a development consisting of two skyscrapers located in the central business district of Singapore. It is located on 4 Battery Road, adjacent to 6 Battery Road, Maybank Tower, and roughly 100 metres from the Fullerton Hotel. The Tower serves as the headquarters for the Bank of China.

History 
The old block of the Bank of China Building was built in 1954 with a total of 18 floors. It was designed by P & T Architects & Engineers Ltd (otherwise known as Palmer and Turner) of Hong Kong.

The pair of lions guarding the entrance is a work by Rudolfo Nolli. The block was the tallest building in the central business district of Singapore, Raffles Place from 1954 till 1974, when it was overtaken by UOB Plaza Two.

The additional new block was completed in 2000. With 36 floors and a height of 168 metres it is built immediately adjacent to the old block and shares a common podium.

See also 
 List of tallest buildings in Singapore
 List of banks in Singapore
 Bank of China

References 

Raffles Place
Downtown Core (Singapore)
Bank of China
Skyscraper office buildings in Singapore
Office buildings completed in 1954
Office buildings completed in 2000
20th-century architecture in Singapore